Ojarud-e Gharbi Rural District is in the Central District of Germi County, Ardabil province, Iran. At the census of 2006, its population was 2,301 in 486 households; there were 1,772 inhabitants in 476 households at the following census of 2011; and in the most recent census of 2016, the population of the rural district was 1,304 in 404 households. The largest of its 13 villages was Zengir, with 296 people.

References 

Germi County

Rural Districts of Ardabil Province

Populated places in Ardabil Province

Populated places in Germi County